Copperas Cove High School is a public high school located in the city of Copperas Cove, Texas, United States, and classified as a 6A school by the UIL. It is a part of the Copperas Cove Independent School District located in the southwest corner of Coryell County. In 2015, the school was rated "Met Standard" by the Texas Education Agency.

Athletics
The Copperas Cove Bulldawgs compete in the following sports:

Baseball
Basketball
Cross Country
Football
Golf
Powerlifting
Soccer
Softball
Swimming and Diving
Tennis
Track and Field
Volleyball
Wrestling

State Finalist
Football:
2006(4A/D1), 2007(4A/D1)

Notable alumni
Josh Boyce - (born May 6, 1991) was a professional football wide receiver for the New England Patriots of the NFL.
Vontez Duff - (born March 8, 1982) was a professional football cornerback for the Chicago Bears of the NFL. 
Robert Griffin III - (born February 12, 1990) is a professional football quarterback for the Baltimore Ravens of the NFL.
T.J. Hollowell - (born April 8, 1981) is the linebackers coach for the Youngstown State Penguins.
Rashard Odomes - (born 1996) is a basketball player in the Israeli Basketball Premier League
Charles Tillman - (born February 23, 1981) was a professional football cornerback for the Chicago Bears and the Carolina Panthers, both of the NFL.
Michael Stipe - (born January 4, 1960) He is best known as the lead singer and main lyricist of R.E.M.
Andrea Bordeaux - (born March 31, 1987), actress, best known for her role as Harley Hidoko in the TV series NCIS: Los Angeles.

References

External links
Copperas Cove ISD website

Public high schools in Texas
Schools in Coryell County, Texas